Transtillaspis chilesana is a species of moth of the family Tortricidae. It is found in Carchi Province, Ecuador.

The wingspan is about 21 mm. The ground colour of the forewings is cream with a slight brownish admixture. The suffusions, dots and strigulation (fine streaks) are brown and the markings are brown with dark brown marks. The hindwings are pale brown, slightly paler basally.

Etymology
The species name refers to the Volcan Chiles Massive in the Carchi Province.

References

Moths described in 2008
Transtillaspis
Taxa named by Józef Razowski